Puia is a Gram-negative, aerobic, rod-shaped and non-motile genus of bacteria from the family of Chitinophagaceae with one known species (Puia dinghuensis). Puia dinghuensis has been isolated from forest soil from the Dinghushan Biosphere Reserve in China.

References

Chitinophagia
Bacteria genera
Monotypic bacteria genera
Taxa described in 2017